Alucita fletcheriana is a species of moth of the family Alucitidae. It is known from the Democratic Republic of Congo.

References

Alucitidae
Moths of Africa
Moths described in 1940
Endemic fauna of the Democratic Republic of the Congo